Slotting may refer to:
the location reserved or selected for storage of each item in a warehouse
the location of products on retail shelves to promote sales in exchange for a slotting fee